Jeremy Vennell (born 6 October 1980) is a former professional racing cyclist from New Zealand.

Career
In 2012 Vennell rode to victory in the National Time Trial Championships which were held in Te Awamutu. Vennell retired in December 2013 after a 7-year cycling career.

Major results
Sources:

2003
 10th Havant International GP
2004
 1st Tour of Crete
 4th Overall Tour of Southland
 8th Overall Tour de Serbie
 9th Overall Flèche du Sud
 10th Overall Tour of Greece
2005
 1st Ronde van Hoegaarden
 3rd National Time Trial Championships
 4th Overall Tour of Southland
1st Stage 6
 4th Overall Tour of Wellington
 7th Grote 1-MeiPrijs
2006
 2nd Overall Tour of Southland
 5th Overall New Zealand Cycle Classic
2007
 7th Overall Tour of Southland
 1st Stages 5 & 6
2008
 4th Cascade Cycling Classic
2009
 1st  National Time Trial Championships
 2nd Overall Tour of Wellington
1st Stage 6 (ITT)
 5th US Air Force Cycling Classic
 6th Overall Cascade Cycling Classic
 7th Overall Tour of Southland
2010
 1st Stage 1 Sea Otter Classic
 2nd National Time Trial Championships
 4th Overall Cascade Cycling Classic
 5th Overall Tour of Elk Grove
 9th Overall Redlands Bicycle Classic
2011
 2nd Overall Joe Martin Stage Race
 3rd Overall Cascade Cycling Classic
 4th National Time Trial Championships
 7th Overall Sea Otter Classic
2012
 National Championships
4th Time Trial
6th Road Race
 Tour of California
 Most courageous, Stage 2
 Most aggressive, Stage 3
 1st The REV Classic
 3rd Tour of the Battenkill
 5th Overall Joe Martin Stage Race
 7th Overall Cascade Cycling Classic
2013
 6th Overall Tour of Southland

References

External links

1980 births
Living people
New Zealand male cyclists
Place of birth missing (living people)
21st-century New Zealand people